WVEL (1140 AM) is a daytimer radio station licensed to Pekin, Illinois, and serving the Peoria metropolitan area.  It is owned by Cumulus Media with the license held by Radio License Holding CBC, LLC. It broadcasts an Urban Gospel radio format, with some Christian talk and teaching shows, and is known as "Central Illinois' Christian Voice."  The radio studios and offices are on Eaton Street in Peoria.

By day, WVEL is powered at 5,000 watts non-directional.  But 1140 AM is a clear channel frequency, reserved for Class A WRVA Richmond, Virginia, and XEMR Monterrey, Mexico.  So WVEL must sign off at sunset to avoid interference.  During critical hours, WVEL has a power of 3,200 watts.

History
The original call sign was WSIV. It increased its power to 1,000 watts on 1948. The station was assigned the WVEL call letters by the Federal Communications Commission on January 2, 1979. Before it was acquired by Cumulus Media in 2012, it was owned by Townsquare Media.

References

External links
WVEL official website
Regent Broadcasting of Peoria

Radio stations established in 1946
VEL
Gospel radio stations in the United States
Pekin, Illinois
1946 establishments in Illinois
Cumulus Media radio stations
VEL
VEL